Leonard A. Mastroni (May 28, 1949 – September 30, 2020) was an American politician. He served as a Republican member for the 117th district in the Kansas House of Representatives from 2017 to 2020.

Early life and education 
Mastroni was born in Bridgeport, Connecticut. He received a Bachelor of Arts degree in political science from Fort Hays State University. He also studied law at the National Judicial College of the University of Nevada, Reno.

Career 
Mastroni served as a police officer in Denver and as supervising officer of the Central Kansas Drug Task Force. He was elected as a district court judge in the Kansas 24th judicial district in 1981 and served 28 years as a judge. He also served six years as a county commissioner in Rush County, Kansas before his election to the Kansas Legislature.

Personal life 
Mastroni lived in La Crosse, Kansas with his wife and family.  He died on September 30, 2020, in La Crosse, Kansas at the age of 71.

References

1949 births
2020 deaths
Lawyers from Bridgeport, Connecticut
Politicians from Bridgeport, Connecticut
People from Rush County, Kansas
American police officers
Fort Hays State University alumni
Republican Party members of the Kansas House of Representatives
Kansas state court judges
County commissioners in Kansas
21st-century American politicians